Zelda Rae Williams (born July 31, 1989) is an American actress, director, producer, and writer. She is the daughter of actor and comedian Robin Williams and film producer and philanthropist Marsha Garces Williams. As a voice actress, she is best known for voicing Kuvira in the Nickelodeon cartoon The Legend of Korra.

Early life
Williams was born in New York City to Robin and Marsha Garces Williams. She was born 10 days after her father's 38th birthday. Her father stated that he named her after Princess Zelda from The Legend of Zelda video game series. Her mother is of Filipino and Finnish descent. Zelda, the older of Williams's children by his second wife, has a younger brother, Cody, and an older half-brother, Zachary Pym "Zak" Williams.

Career
She made her acting debut at age 5. At 15, Williams acted in the 2004 film House of D opposite her father and actor Anton Yelchin as the latter's young first love, Melissa Loggia.

In June 2011, both she and her father were featured in a television commercial for the Nintendo 3DS game The Legend of Zelda: Ocarina of Time 3D. On October 25, 2011, she was the special guest host at the London Zelda Symphony Concert at the Hammersmith Apollo, marking the 25th anniversary of the Zelda Series. On November 17, 2011, subscribers to Nintendo emails received an email of her and her father playing the new game The Legend of Zelda: Skyward Sword for the Wii console. She appears in an interview with Nintendo representatives in which she says that one of her favorite things to do in her free time is play Super Smash Bros. Melee with her friends, always playing as the character Sheik.

She appeared in People magazine's 100 Most Beautiful People issue for 2007. She appears in the Wynter Gordon music video for "Buy My Love" and has a cameo in the Cobra Starship music video "You Make Me Feel", alongside her father.

In 2018, Williams wrote and directed the short film Shrimp, which she also starred in alongside Conor Leslie, Paulina Singer, Frances Fisher, and Jake Abel. The film depicts the lives of dominatrices in a Los Angeles BDSM den. Williams later entered into a deal with Gunpowder & Sky to develop the short film into a half-hour series.

She directed the upcoming 2023 movie Lisa Frankenstein in her feature-length debut.

Personal life
Williams has described herself as an avid athlete and video game player, and a fan of her namesake The Legend of Zelda series. She has stated that The Legend of Zelda: Majora's Mask is her favorite game and had voiced support of its release on the 3DS by supporting Operation Moonfall. She dated actor Jackson Heywood from 2013 to 2016.

Filmography

Film

Television

Music videos

Video games

References

External links

 

1989 births
Living people
20th-century American actresses
21st-century American actresses
Actresses from Los Angeles
Actresses from New York City
Actresses from San Francisco
American actresses of Filipino descent
American child actresses
American film actresses
American people of English descent
American people of Finnish descent
American people of French descent
American people of German descent
American people of Irish descent
American people of Scottish descent
American people of Welsh descent
American television actresses
American voice actresses
Bisexual actresses  
LGBT people from New York (state)
Nintendo game players
Robin Williams
American bisexual actors